The Numfor leaf warbler (Phylloscopus maforensis) is a species of Old World warbler in the family Phylloscopidae.
It is endemic to Numfor in Indonesia.

References

Numfor leaf warbler
Birds of the Schouten Islands
Numfor leaf warbler